The 2011 Newfoundland and Labrador general election took place on October 11, 2011, to elect members of the 47th General Assembly of Newfoundland and Labrador. The Progressive Conservative Party (PC Party) formed a majority government in the 2007 election, with the Liberal Party serving as the Official Opposition and the New Democratic Party (NDP) serving as a third party.

Under amendments passed by the Legislature in 2004, elections in Newfoundland and Labrador are now held on fixed dates: the second Tuesday in October every four years.

The Progressive Conservatives, led by Kathy Dunderdale, won their third consecutive majority government. Dunderdale became only the third woman in Canadian history to lead a political party to power. The Liberal Party, led by Kevin Aylward, formed the Official Opposition, however the party placed third in the popular vote and Aylward himself was not elected to the legislature. Lorraine Michael's New Democratic Party won a record number of seats and placed second in the popular vote for the first time in the province's history.

Background

Progressive Conservative Party

Liberal Party

New Democratic Party

Party leadership
Following Liberal leader Gerry Reid's defeat in the 2007 general election he resigned as the party's leader. The party subsequently chose Cartwright-L'Anse au Clair MHA Yvonne Jones as interim leader of the party and therefore the Official Opposition Leader in the House of Assembly. The party delayed calling a leadership election until 2010, and when nominations for the leadership closed on July 30, 2010 Jones was the only candidate to come forward and was acclaimed leader of the party. Only weeks later on August 13, 2010, Jones announced she had been diagnosed with breast cancer and would be taking time off to undergo treatment. During her time off Liberal House Leader Kelvin Parsons took over for Jones on an interim basis. The Liberal convention that would swear Jones in as leader was rescheduled from October 2010, to May 2011, due to her illness. She was sworn in as leader on May 28, 2011. On August 8, 2011, it was announced that Jones would step down as leader the following day on the advice of her doctor. The Liberal Party executive chose former MHA and cabinet minister Kevin Aylward as her successor on August 14, 2011.

On November 25, 2010, Premier Danny Williams made the surprise announcement that he would resign as leader and premier the next week. On December 3, 2010, Kathy Dunderdale, Williams' Deputy Premier, was sworn in as Newfoundland and Labrador's tenth Premier. Although she had originally stated she would not seek the permanent leadership she announced on December 30, 2010, she would run for the Progressive Conservative leadership. Her announcement came after several high-profile cabinet ministers announced they would not run and endorsed her candidacy. In January 2011, Dunderdale was acclaimed party leader when she was the only eligible candidate to seek the leadership. On April 2, 2011, she was sworn in as leader of the Progressive Conservatives.

Timeline

2007
 October 9, 2007: Elections held for the Newfoundland and Labrador Legislature in the 46th General Assembly of Newfoundland and Labrador.
 November 6, 2007: Progressive Conservative Susan Sullivan wins a deferred election in Grand Falls-Windsor-Buchans.
 November 13, 2007: Liberal leader Gerry Reid resign after failing to be re-elected.
 November 15, 2007: The Liberal Party select Yvonne Jones as interim leader of the party.

2008
 May 21, 2008: Tom Rideout resigns as Deputy Premier, Government House Leader and Minister of Fisheries, in a dispute with the Premier's Office.
 June 4, 2008: Cape St. Francis MHA Jack Byrne dies.
 June 30, 2008: Baie Verte-Springdale MHA Tom Rideout resigns his seat.
 August 27, 2008: Two by-elections in Cape St. Francis and Baie Verte-Springdale are won by Progressive Conservative candidates Kevin Parsons and Kevin Pollard.

2009
 October 2, 2009: The Straits – White Bay North MHA Trevor Taylor resigns from Cabinet and his seat.
 October 7, 2009: Terra Nova MHA Paul Oram resign from Cabinet and his seat.
 October 27, 2009: A by-election in The Straits – White Bay North elects Liberal Marshall Dean.
 November 26, 2009: A by-election in Terra Nova elects PC Sandy Collins.

2010
 January 29, 2010: Topsail MHA Elizabeth Marshall resigns her seat to be appointed to the Senate of Canada.
 March 16, 2010: A by-election in Topsail elects PC Paul Davis.
 July 30, 2010: Cartwright-L'Anse au Clair MHA Yvonne Jones is acclaimed Liberal leader after being the only candidate for the party's leader.
 August 13, 2010: Yvonne Jones announces she has been diagnosed with breast cancer and that MHA Kelvin Parsons will serve as interim leader while she is receiving treatment.
 October 3, 2010: Conception Bay East - Bell Island MHA and Minister Dianne Whalen dies.
 November 25, 2010: Premier Danny Williams, Humber West MHA announces his retirement, effective December 3, 2010. Deputy Premier Kathy Dunderdale will be the Premier of the province in the interim.
 December 2, 2010: Progressive Conservative candidate David Brazil is elected MHA of Conception Bay East - Bell Island.
 December 3, 2010: Kathy Dunderdale is sworn in as the province's tenth Premier upon the resignation of Danny Williams, the first woman to do so.

2011
 February 15, 2011: Progressive Conservative candidate Vaughn Granter is elected MHA of Humber West.
 April 2, 2011: Kathy Dunderdale is sworn in as leader of the Progressive Conservative Party.
 May 28, 2011: Yvonne Jones is sworn in as leader of the Liberal Party.
 August 9, 2011: Jones steps down as leader of the Liberal Party due to health reasons.
 August 14, 2011: Kevin Aylward is chosen as leader of the Liberal Party.
 September 19, 2011: Election call, Kathy Dunderdale asks Lieutenant Governor John Crosbie to dissolve the legislature.

Campaign

At 10:00 am on September 19, 2011, Premier Dunderdale met with Lieutenant Governor John Crosbie who dissolved the 46th General Assembly, officially launching the election campaign. It was widely expected that the PCs would win the election.

Campaign slogans
The parties campaign slogans for the 2011 election are:
Liberal Party – "We Can Do Better"
New Democratic Party – "It's Time"
Progressive Conservative – "New Energy"

Issues
Muskrat Falls
The tentative deal to develop the $6.2 billion Muskrat Falls hydroelectric project in Labrador was negotiated by the Progressive Conservative government in November 2010. The Liberal Party opposes the deal, saying it is bad for the province because it will increase the province's debt and will see electricity rates increase for consumers. The NDP have had similar concerns and both party leaders have called for spending on the project to stop until more independent analysis' can be conducted to see if the current deal is the best one for the province.

Public sector pension increases
The Liberal Party announced they would provide a one-time increase to public sector pensioners of 2.5%, as well as provide annual increases equivalent to the Consumer Price Index (CPI) up to 2%. While Aylward has said increasing payments would cost $13 million in the first year and about $10 million extra for each additional year, the Department of Finance stated that the plan would add $1.2 billion in additional liabilities to the pension plan. Dunderdale slammed the Liberal Party's plan calling it 'foolhardy'.

Controversies
Dunderdale confrontation with fisheries workers
Toward the end of the campaign, Tory Leader Kathy Dunderdale was confronted by frustrated fisheries workers in Marystown in the district of Burin-Placentia West held by Minister of Fisheries & Aquaculture Clyde Jackman. Dunderdale, accompanied by Jackman and Grand Bank district MHA Darin King, refused to negotiate with the workers until after the election. Jackman went on to win the election by only 40 votes.

Dumaresque comment
Controversy arose at the St. John's Board of Trade debate when Liberal candidate Danny Dumaresque was asked about an appeal by the mayor of St. John's for a new financial arrangement between the city and the provincial government. Dumaresque stated that "there are a hell of a lot more priorities outside the overpass that need to be addressed before we start forking more money over to the City of St. John's." The comment led to divisions within the party, with Liberal candidate Drew Brown stating it was an “idiotic comment by an idiotic man.”

Election summary

|- style="background:#ccc;"
! rowspan="2" colspan="2" style="text-align:left;"|Party
! rowspan="2" style="text-align:left;"|Party leader
!rowspan="2"|Candidates
! colspan="4" style="text-align:center;"|Seats
! colspan="3" style="text-align:center;"|Popular vote
|- style="background:#ccc;"
| style="text-align:center;"|2007
| style="text-align:center;"|Dissol.
| style="text-align:center;"|2011
| style="text-align:center;"|Change
| style="text-align:center;"|#
| style="text-align:center;"|%
| style="text-align:center;"|% Change

| style="text-align:left;" |Kathy Dunderdale
| style="text-align:right;" |48
| style="text-align:right;" |44
| style="text-align:right;" |43
| style="text-align:right;" |37
| style="text-align:right;" |-6
| style="text-align:right;" |124,523
| style="text-align:right;" |56.1%
| style="text-align:right;" |-13.49%

| style="text-align:left;" |Kevin Aylward
| style="text-align:right;" |48
| style="text-align:right;" |3
| style="text-align:right;" |4
| style="text-align:right;" |6
| style="text-align:right;" |+2
| style="text-align:right;" |42.417
| style="text-align:right;" |19.1%
| style="text-align:right;" |-2.59%

| style="text-align:left;" |Lorraine Michael
| style="text-align:right;" |48
| style="text-align:right;" |1
| style="text-align:right;" |1
| style="text-align:right;" |5
| style="text-align:right;" |+4
| style="text-align:right;" |54,713
| style="text-align:right;" |24.6%
| style="text-align:right;" |+16.11%

| style="text-align:left;" colspan="2"|Independents
| style="text-align:right;" |3
| style="text-align:right;" |0
| style="text-align:right;" |0
| style="text-align:right;" |0
| style="text-align:right;" |0
| style="text-align:right;" |430
| style="text-align:right;" |0.2%
| style="text-align:right;" |
|-
| style="text-align:left;" colspan="3"|Total
| style="text-align:right;"|
| style="text-align:right;"|48
| style="text-align:right;"|48
| style="text-align:right;"|48
| style="text-align:right;"|
| style="text-align:right;"|222,083
| style="text-align:right;"|100%
| style="text-align:right;"| 
|}

Results by region

Results by district
Bold incumbents indicates party leaders. The premier's name is boldfaced and italicized.

All candidate names are those on the official list of confirmed candidates; names in media or on party website may differ slightly.
Names in boldface type represent party leaders.
† represents that the incumbent is not running again.
§ represents that the incumbent was defeated for nomination.
₰ represents that the incumbent ran in another district and lost the nomination
‡ represents that the incumbent is running in a different district.

St. John's

|-
| style="background:whitesmoke;"| Kilbride
||
|John Dinn3,34758.32%
|
|Brian Hanlon4547.91%
|
|Paul Boundridge1,92733.58%
||
|John Dinn
|-
| style="background:whitesmoke;"| Signal Hill—Quidi Vidi
|
|John Noseworthy1,55031.17%
|
| Drew Brown1733.48%
||
|Lorraine Michael3,23965.13%
||
|Lorraine Michael
|-
| style="background:whitesmoke;"| St. John's Centre
|
|Shawn Skinner2,04143.13%
|
|Carly Bigelow1092.30%
||
| Gerry Rogers2,56954.29%
||
|Shawn Skinner
|-
| style="background:whitesmoke;"| St. John's East
|
|Ed Buckingham2,17540.77%
|
|Mike Duffy3676.88%
||
|George Murphy2,76651.85%
||
|Ed Buckingham
|-
| style="background:whitesmoke;"| St. John's North
|
|Bob Ridgley1,90540.29%
|
|Elizabeth Scammel Reynolds2014.25%
||
|Dale Kirby2,59554.89%
||
|Bob Ridgley
|-
| style="background:whitesmoke;"| St. John's South
||
|Tom Osborne2,96757.71%
|
|Trevor Hickey1633.17%
|
|Keith Dunne1,99438.79%
||
|Tom Osborne
|-
| style="background:whitesmoke;"| St. John's West
||
|Dan Crummell2,00443.25%
|
|George Joyce89019.21%
|
|Chris Pickard1,72937.32%
||
|Sheila Osborne†
|-
| style="background:whitesmoke;"| Virginia Waters
||
|Kathy Dunderdale3,37159.85%
|
|Sheila Miller5369.52%
|
|Dave Sullivan1,70830.33%
||
|Kathy Dunderdale
|}

St. John's suburbs

|-
| style="background:whitesmoke;"|Cape St. Francis
||
|Kevin Parsons4,13259.06%
|
|Joy Buckle2042.92%
|
|Geoff Gallant2,62337.49%
||
|Kevin Parsons
|-
| style="background:whitesmoke;"|Conception Bay East - Bell Island
||
|David Brazil3,05954.91%
|
|Kim Ploughman2133.82%
|
|Bill Kavanagh2,29041.11%
||
|David Brazil
|-
| style="background:whitesmoke;"|Conception Bay South
||
|Terry French3,63269.01%
|
|Cynthia Layden Barron3546.73%
|
|Noah Davis-Power1,26324.00%
||
|Terry French
|-
| style="background:whitesmoke;"|Mount Pearl North
||
|Steve Kent3,72770.82%
|
|Maurice Budgell3636.90%
|
|Kurtis Coombs99418.89%
||
|Steve Kent
|-
| style="background:whitesmoke;"|Mount Pearl South
||
|Paul Lane2,37554.52%
|
|Norm Snelgrove2996.86%
|
|John Riche1,67538.45%
||
|Dave Denine†
|-
| style="background:whitesmoke;"|Topsail
||
|Paul Davis3,86068.26%
|
|Nic Reid2804.95%
|
|Brian Nolan1,50726.65%
||
|Paul Davis
|}

Avalon and Burin Peninsulas

|-
| style="background:whitesmoke;"|Bellevue
||
|Calvin Peach3,00560.12%
|
|Pam Pardy Ghent62612.53%
|
|Gabe Ryan1,35627.13%
|
|
||
|Calvin Peach
|-
| style="background:whitesmoke;"|Burin—Placentia West
||
|Clyde Jackman2,53848.34%
|
|Jacqueline Mullett2023.85%
|
|Julie Mitchell2,49847.58%
|
|
||
|Clyde Jackman
|-
| style="background:whitesmoke;"|Carbonear—Harbour Grace
||
|Jerome Kennedy3,99375.94%
|
|Phillip Earle77414.72%
|
|Shawn Hyde4458.46%
|
|Kyle Brookings (Independent)220.42%
||
|Jerome Kennedy
|-
| style="background:whitesmoke;"|Ferryland
||
|Keith Hutchings3,64071.99%
|
|Dianne Randell1813.58%
|
|Chris Molloy1,22424.21%
|
|
||
|Keith Hutchings
|-
| style="background:whitesmoke;"|Grand Bank
||
|Darin King3,27168.33%
|
|Carol Anne Haley1,33627.91%
|
|Wally Layman1673.49%
|
|
||
|Darin King
|-
| style="background:whitesmoke;"|Harbour Main
||
|Tom Hedderson3,60069.32%
|
|Bern Hickey58011.17%
|
|Mike Maher99019.06%
|
|
||
|Tom Hedderson
|-
| style="background:whitesmoke;"|Placentia—St. Mary's
||
|Felix Collins2,51649.71%
|
|Todd Squires1,05520.85%
|
|Trish Dodd1,47529.14%
|
|
||
|Felix Collins
|-
| style="background:whitesmoke;"|Port de Grave
||
|Glenn Littlejohn3,55159.33%
|
|Leanne Hussey2,02233.78%
|
|Sarah Downey3966.62%
|
|
||
|Roland Butler†
|-
| style="background:whitesmoke;"|Trinity—Bay de Verde
||
|Charlene Johnson2,88961.73%
|
|Barry Snow1,11423.86%
|
|Sheina Lerman65914.11%
|
|
||
|Charlene Johnson
|}

Central Newfoundland

|-
| style="background:whitesmoke;"|Baie Verte—Springdale
||
|Kevin Pollard2,55252.65%
|
|Neil Ward1,82737.69%
|
|Tim Howse4569.41%
|
|
||
|Kevin Pollard
|-
| style="background:whitesmoke;"|Bonavista North
||
|Eli Cross1,72346.26%
|
|Paul Kean1,51840.75%
|
|John Coaker46712.54%
|
|
||
|Harry Harding†
|-
| style="background:whitesmoke;"|Bonavista South
||
|Glen Little2,21455.99%
|
|Johanna Ryan Guy53213.45%
|
|Darryl Johnson1,19830.30%
|
|
||
|Roger Fitzgerald†
|-
| style="background:whitesmoke;"|Exploits
||
|Clayton Forsey2,81968.64%
|
|Jim Samson65415.92%
|
|Grant Hemeon62915.32%
|
|
||
|Clayton Forsey
|-
| style="background:whitesmoke;"|Gander
||
|Kevin O'Brien2,39352.09%
|
|Barry Warren1,41530.80%
|
|Lukas Norman77016.76%
|
|
||
|Kevin O'Brien
|-
| style="background:whitesmoke;"|Grand Falls-Windsor—Buchans
||
|Susan Sullivan2,95761.44%
|
|Wayne Morris1,54031.20%
|
|John Whelan3136.27%
|
|
||
|Susan Sullivan
|-
| style="background:whitesmoke;"|Grand Falls-Windsor—Green Bay South
||
|Ray Hunter2,13157.16%
|
|Merv Wiseman1,16531.25%
|
|Clyde Bridger41811.21%
|
|
||
|Ray Hunter
|-
| style="background:whitesmoke;"|Lewisporte
||
|Wade Verge2,45056.48%
|
|Todd Manuel89120.54%
|
|Lloyd Snow98822.78%
|
|
||
|Wade Verge
|-
| style="background:whitesmoke;"|Terra Nova
||
|Sandy Collins2,78562.92%
|
|Ryan Lane63114.26%
|
|Robin Brentnall64814.64%
|
|John Baird (Independent)3467.82%
||
|Sandy Collins
|-
| style="background:whitesmoke;"|The Isles of Notre Dame
||
|Derrick Dalley2,74667.48%
|
|Danny Dumaresque1,07026.12%
|
|Tree Walsh2526.15%
|
|
||
|Derrick Dalley
|-
| style="background:whitesmoke;"|Trinity North
||
|Ross Wiseman3,21166.74%
|
|Brad Cabana3447.15%
|
|Vanessa Wiseman1,24725.92%
|
|
||
|Ross Wiseman
|}

Western and Southern Newfoundland

|-
| style="background:whitesmoke;"|Bay of Islands
|
|Terry Loder2,00337.05%
||
|Eddie Joyce2,76051.05%
|
|Tony Adey62511.56%
|
|
||
|Terry Loder
|-
| style="background:whitesmoke;"|Burgeo—La Poile
|
|Colin Short1,85043.14%
||
|Andrew Parsons2,22851.96%
|
|Matt Fuchs1974.59%
|
|
||
|Kelvin Parsons†
|-
| style="background:whitesmoke;"|Fortune Bay—Cape La Hune
||
|Tracey Perry2,59267.06%
|
|Eric Skinner59615.42%
|
|Susan Skinner66517.21%
|
|
||
|Tracey Perry
|-
| style="background:whitesmoke;"|Humber East
||
|Tom Marshall3,49377.97%
|
|Charles Murphy3788.44%
|
|Marc Best59313.24%
|
|
||
|Tom Marshall
|-
| style="background:whitesmoke;"|Humber Valley
|
|Darryl Kelly2,54146.72%
||
|Dwight Ball2,60947.97%
|
|Sheldon Hynes2704.96%
|
|
||
|Darryl Kelly
|-
| style="background:whitesmoke;"|Humber West
||
|Vaughn Granter2,33559.28%
|
|Donna Luther83221.12%
|
|Jordan Stringer76519.42%
|
|
||
|Vaughn Granter
|-
| style="background:whitesmoke;"|Port au Port
||
|Tony Cornect2,60958.69%
|
|Kate Mitchell-Mansfield95421.46%
|
|Jamie Brace86019.35%
|
|
||
|Tony Cornect
|-
| style="background:whitesmoke;"|St. Barbe
|
|Wallace Young1,77944.05%
||
|Jim Bennett44.94%
|
|Diane Ryan43710.82%
|
|
||
|Wallace Young
|-
| style="background:whitesmoke;"|St. George's—Stephenville East
||
|Joan Burke2,10449.08%
|
|Kevin Aylward1,39632.56%
|
|Bernice Hancock70516.45%
|
|Dean Simon (Independent)621.45%
||
|Joan Burke
|-
| style="background:whitesmoke;"|The Straits - White Bay North
|
|Selma Pike1,33631.46%
|
|Marshall Dean1,38232.54%
||
|Chris Mitchelmore1,51135.58%
|
|
||
|Marshall Dean
|}

Labrador

|-
| style="background:whitesmoke;"|Cartwright—L'Anse au Clair
|
|Glen Acreman57626.77%
||
|Yvonne Jones1,51671.07%
|
|Bill Cooper442.06%
||
|Yvonne Jones
|-
| style="background:whitesmoke;"|Labrador West
||
|Nick McGrath1,84350.80%
|
|Karen Oldford59316.35%
|
|Tom Harris1,18232.58%
||
|Jim Baker†
|-
| style="background:whitesmoke;"|Lake Melville
||
|Keith Russell1,74149.50%
|
|Chris Montague53115.10%
|
|Arlene Michelin-Pittman1,20934.38%
||
|John Hickey†
|-
| style="background:whitesmoke;"|Torngat Mountains
|
|Patty Pottle58637.66%
||
|Randy Edmunds74447.81%
|
|Alex Saunders18611.95%
||
|Patty Pottle
|}

MHAs not running again

Liberal
Roland Butler, Port de Grave
Kelvin Parsons, Burgeo-LaPoile

Progressive Conservative
Jim Baker, Labrador West
Dave Denine, Mount Pearl South
Roger Fitzgerald, Bonavista South
Harry Harding, Bonavista North
John Hickey, Lake Melville
Sheila Osborne, St. John's West

Opinion polls

References

Further reading

Political parties
Progressive Conservative Party of Newfoundland and Labrador
Liberal Party of Newfoundland and Labrador
Newfoundland and Labrador New Democratic Party

External links
 CBC – Newfoundland and Labrador Votes 2011
 Elections Newfoundland and Labrador
 Election Almanac – Newfoundland and Labrador Provincial Election 2011

Elections in Newfoundland and Labrador
2011 elections in Canada
2011 in Newfoundland and Labrador
October 2011 events in Canada